The following is a list of George Foster Peabody Award winners and honorable mentions during the decade of the 2020s.

2020

2021

References

 List2020